Jákup Jógvansson was Lawman of the Faroe Islands from 1677 to 1679.

Jákup Jógvansson was Faroese, and son of former Lawman Jógvan Poulsen. Jákup had also been a sysselmann (sheriff) on Sandoy. He lived and worked on the farm of Dalsgarður in Skálavík.

References

Løgtingið 150 - Hátíðarrit. Tórshavn 2002, Bind 2, S. 366. (Avsnitt Føroya løgmenn fram til 1816) (PDF-Download)

Lawmen of the Faroe Islands
Year of birth unknown
Year of death unknown